The Harrah's Cherokee Center - Asheville, previously known as the U.S. Cellular Center and originally as the Asheville Civic Center Complex, is a multipurpose entertainment center, located in Asheville, North Carolina. Opened in 1974, the complex is home to an arena, auditorium, banquet hall and meeting rooms.

Venues
ExploreAsheville.com Arena (formerly the "Asheville Civic Center Arena" from 1974–2011) is the main arena/venue of the civic center. It holds 7,674 guests.
Thomas Wolfe Auditorium (originally the "Asheville City Auditorium" from 1940 to 1975) is a horseshoe-shaped theatre located to the north of the arena. The auditorium was originally built in 1939 as a part of the Works Progress Administration. Opening in January 1940, it was renovated in 1974 and reopened December 1975. It currently holds 2,431 guests. 
Banquet Hall is a ballroom that holds nearly 500 guests.

History
In July 1968, the Asheville City Council approved a civic center plan which would add an exhibition center, meeting space and an arena to Thomas Wolfe Auditorium. As downtown was declining due to suburban development and malls, the complex would be a way to help downtown make a comeback. The arena was the first venue of its type in the city.

It was home to the Asheville Altitude basketball team in the NBDL, before the franchise moved to Tulsa in 2005 and the United Hockey League's Asheville Smoke and also the SPHL's Asheville Aces.

The venue also hosted WCW Clash of the Champions XII, WCW SuperBrawl III, WCW Monday Nitro where the famed nWo wreaked havoc over the Ric Flair-led Four Horsemen and Fall Brawl (1995) as well as the 1999 and 2000 Big South Conference men's basketball tournament and 1984–1995 Southern Conference men's basketball tournament. The age and the condition of the facility helped lead to the Southern Conference's departure.

Commencement exercises for the University of North Carolina at Asheville were last held in the venue in 1999.

With the Civic Center losing money, improvements took place starting in 2010.

Proposed renovations
The City of Asheville and State of North Carolina have been pressured by many in the community to replace or renovate the aging Civic Center with more modern facilities. This debate has been going on for years, with no apparent end. City Council passed a measure funding basic maintenance and has earmarked $1.5 million for the implementation of a "living roof" to replace the aging conventional roof. The ultimate path for the Civic Center was unclear. A complete renovation was still an option. The most popular proposals from the community were to tear down and rebuild in the same location, or to rebuild in an area south of city hall, at the Biltmore Square Mall site, or near the Western North Carolina Agriculture Center.

Naming history
On November 22, 2011, Asheville City Council voted to name the facility for U.S. Cellular, provided no other companies made a higher bid by December 31. The name change was effective January 1, 2012. U.S. Cellular will pay $810,000 or more over five years and up to $1.35 million over eight years. The money will help with $5.5 million in renovations.

On May 29, 2019, Asheville City Council approved a bid from Harrah's Cherokee. The five-year $3.25 million deal took effect in 2020.

Events
The arena played host to the politically motivated Vote for Change on October 6, 2004, featuring performances by Gob Roberts, Death Cab for Cutie and Pearl Jam.

Performing acts in 2013 and beyond includes Southern Conference, Curious George, Ringling Bros., The Color Purple, Bill Cosby, Sesame Street Live, Mannheim Steamroller, Charlotte Bobcats, Atlanta Hawks, Elton John, Elvis Presley, Jeff Dunham, Marty Stewart, Harlem Globetrotters, Trans-Siberian Orchestra, The National, WWE, TNA Impact Wrestling, Gordon Lightfoot, Foster the People, Celtic Woman, Casting Crowns, Toby Keith, Sugarland, Bob Dylan, Jerry Seinfeld, Yo Gabba Gabba, The family Stone, Brit Floyd, Band of Horses, Lee "Shot" Williams, Queens of the Stone Age, Moscow Ballet, Darius Rucker, Umphrey's McGee, Ohio Players, Disney Junior LIVE, Hunter Hayes, Slayer, and MercyMe.

The Southern Conference brought the 2012, 2013, and 2014 basketball tournaments to the arena. In anticipation of the tournament, the city pledged a $3.2 million renovation of the facility. In February 2018 the arena hosted a Fed Cup tennis tie between the United States and the Netherlands, featuring Serena Williams and Venus Williams.

On August 13, 2014, a major motion picture named Masterminds was filmed outside and inside at the arena standing in as a Mexico airport with palm trees everywhere.

References

Asheville Altitude
Basketball venues in North Carolina
Buildings and structures in Asheville, North Carolina
College basketball venues in the United States
Defunct NBA G League venues
Indoor arenas in North Carolina
Indoor ice hockey venues in the United States
Sports in Asheville, North Carolina
Tourist attractions in Asheville, North Carolina
1974 establishments in North Carolina
Sports venues completed in 1974